Canoe polo were featured at the 2018 Asian Games as a demonstration sport, meaning medals won in this sport would not be counted in the official overall medal tally. It was held from 27 to 29 August 2018.

Medalists

Medal table

Results

Men

Qualification round
27–28 August

Group A

Group B

Loser pool
28 August

Final round

Women

Qualification round
27 August

Group A

Group B

Loser pool
28 August

Final round

References

External links
Technical Handbook
Asian Canoe Confederation

2018 Asian Games events
2018
Asian Games
2018 Asian Games